Banbridge A.F.C. was an intermediate-level football club playing in the Mid-Ulster Football League in Northern Ireland. The club was based in Banbridge. In 2014, the club merged with Banbridge Town.

References 

Defunct association football clubs in Northern Ireland
Association football clubs in County Down
Association football clubs established in 1997
Association football clubs disestablished in 2014
1997 establishments in Northern Ireland
2014 disestablishments in Northern Ireland
AFC